A South Sea Bubble is a 1928 British silent comedy adventure film directed by T. Hayes Hunter and starring Ivor Novello, Benita Hume and Alma Taylor. The screenplay concerns a group of adventurers who head to the Pacific Ocean to hunt for buried treasure. It was made at Islington Studios.

Cast
 Ivor Novello as Vernon Winslow
 Benita Hume as Averil Rochester
 Alma Taylor as Mary Ottery
 Annette Benson as Lydia la Rue
 Sydney Seaward as William Carpenter
 S. J. Warmington as Frank Sullivan
 Ben Field as Isinglass
 Harold Huth as Pirate
 John F. Hamilton as Tony Gates
 Mary Dibley as Olive Barbary

References

Bibliography
 Wood, Linda. British Films, 1927-1939. British Film Institute, 1986.

External links
 

1928 films
1920s adventure comedy films
Films directed by T. Hayes Hunter
British adventure comedy films
British silent feature films
Islington Studios films
Gainsborough Pictures films
British black-and-white films
1928 comedy films
1920s English-language films
1920s British films
Silent adventure comedy films

The below is a transcription from a ship's manifest and relates to the making of the film "A South Sea Bubble";

Vessel; Jan Pieterszoon Coen (Nederland Royal Mail Line)
Departed; 4th February 1928
From; Southampton
Destination; Algiers (and onwards)

On the passenger list in 1st Class were;

Mr. Sydney Sidmer Seaward as Actor
Mr. William John Hamilton as Actor
Mr. Stanley James Warmington as Actor
Mr. Benjamin Arthur Field as Actor
Mr. Robert Holmes as Actor

Mrs. Benita Siepmann as Actress (Professionally known as Benita Hume) sic, as on page
Mrs. Lilian Ames as Actress (Professionally known as Mary Dibley) sic, as on page
Mrs. Kathleen Lenzer as Actress (professionally known as Annette Benson) - sic, as on page
Mrs. Violet Weinstein as Actress (this entry was struck through)
Miss Alma Taylor as Film Artist

Mr. James Graham Kelly as Assistant Film Director
Mr. John Henry Morley as Camera Mechanic
Mr. Richard George Wilson as Cinematographer
Mr. John Charles Ramsay as Property Master
Mr. Reginald Ernest Enckell Beck as Assistant Camera Man

Ivor Novello as Musical Composer of 11 Aldwych, London, WC2
William Lloyd Charles Williams as Private Secretary of 11 Aldwych, London, WC2